Edmond Polchlopek (20 July 1934 – 21 September 2004) was a French road racing cyclist and a bicycle designer. The so-called Polchlopek crankset was the first elliptical chainring to be commercialized.

References
 
 L. Malfait, G. Storme, M. Derdeyn (2012) Non Circular Chainrings for Cycling

1934 births
2004 deaths
Cyclists from Normandy
French male cyclists
Sportspeople from Calvados (department)